The 2018–19 Alabama Crimson Tide men's basketball team represented the University of Alabama in the 2018–19 NCAA Division I men's basketball season. The team was led by fourth-year head coach Avery Johnson and played its home games at Coleman Coliseum in Tuscaloosa, Alabama as a member of the Southeastern Conference. They finished the season 18-16, 8-10 in SEC play to finish in a tie for ninth place in SEC play. They defeated Ole Miss to advance to the quarterfinals of the SEC tournament where they lost to Kentucky. They received an invitation to the National Invitation Tournament where they lost in the First Round to Norfolk State.

On March 24, 2019, the school fired head coach Avery Johnson. A few days later, the school hired Buffalo head coach Nate Oats as coach.

Previous season
The Crimson Tide finished the 2017–18 season 20–16, 8–10 in SEC play to finish in a tie for ninth place. They defeated Texas A&M and Auburn in the SEC tournament before losing in the semifinals to Kentucky. They received an at-large bid to the NCAA tournament where they defeated Virginia Tech in the First Round before losing in the Second Round to Villanova.

Offseason

Departures

2018 recruiting class

Roster

Schedule and results

|-
!colspan=12 style=|Exhibition

|-
!colspan=12 style=|Regular season

|-
!colspan=12 style=|  SEC Tournament

|-
!colspan=12 style="background:#990000; color:#FFFFFF;"| National Invitation Tournament

References

Alabama
Alabama Crimson Tide men's basketball seasons
Alabama Crimson Tide
Alabama Crimson Tide
Alabama